Lim Mei Fen made her debut on 8TV's talent search program, I Wanna Be A Model in 2006, and became an actress shortly after. She also appeared on NTV7's game show, Deal or No Deal for two years from 2007. In 2013, she starred in Malaysia's first real movie, The Cage together with award-winning actress, Yeo Yann Yann.

Her involvement in theatre began with the mega play TAKHTA 3 RATU (2014) at National Theatre as Princess Hang Li Po. She wrote, produced, and acted in 2018's National Day production entitled Tanah Akhirku. Prime Minister and his wife showed up to watch the show at Istana Budaya.[1]

She was nominated as Best Actress by Kuala Lumpur Film Critics Association for her portrayal as the traumatic younger sister in James Lee's film TWO SISTERS (2019).

She is currently pursuing her master's degree with Beijing Film Academy, in Film Distribution & Marketing.

Career

When returning from North California, she takes part in 8tv's 'I WANNA BE A MODEL' reality show (2006). Afterwards she get a 2 years contract as briefcase model number one in 'DEAL OR NO DEAL' TV game show.

In 2009, she went behind scene and joint Juita Viden media group and created the first Hokkien drama in Malaysia. 25 episodes Home Rhythms《家缘》was aired on Astro Hua Hee Dai. It was written based on Mei Fen's grandfather story.

A call from her dad brought her back to Penang and she helped manage her family business for few years.

In 2013, she re-debut herself as a newcomer in acting after being offered a feature role in <Back To Time FM 1970> with ntv7. Her credits in film are TWO SISTERS (2019), Prebet Sapu (2021) and The Cage (2014).

Her first appearance on the stage through mega theatre <Takhta 3 Ratu> (2014) at Istana Budaya (National Theatre) had opened a new chapter for her. Due to her impressive acting in reviving the character of Princess Hang Li Po, this Penang-born talent started to call the attention of many. She played princess ‘LiLi Poh' in ZombieLaLaLa (2016) at Istana Budaya.

In late 2016, as a national representative, she toured together with the multiracial casts from National Academy of Art, Culture & Heritage (ASWARA) to ASEAN Theatre Week (China) and Festival Tokyo; and successfully performed in front of an international audiences.

Filmography

Film

Drama series

Theatre

References

External links
 

1987 births
Living people
Malaysian film actresses
Malaysian people of Chinese descent
20th-century Malaysian actresses
21st-century Malaysian actresses